Nyanturago is a town in Kisii County, Kenya. It is part if Gusii County council and Masaba division.

It is the birthplace of famous runner Jackline Maranga.

Climate

References

Kisii County
Populated places in Nyanza Province